The  were sets of laws first enacted in 146 BC designed to aid in the regulation and administration of the Roman provinces. Then the charter was enacted, provided it was approved by the Senate.

History 
In 167 BC, for example, Lucius Aemilius Paulus imposed an extensive settlement on Macedonia. Paulus and his commission divided Macedonia into four independent republics; and they wrote laws for each region, including the amount of tribute to be paid to Rome. Settlements prior to 146 BC, including Paulus' settlement of Macedonia, were informal. The , or  originated in 146 BC after Scipio Aemilianus' settlement of Africa. Like previous provincial organization, Africa was settled without a formal charter3. Later that year, however, the senate seems to have passed the leges provinciae, which created formal constitutions for the provinces and set a precedent for future conquests5.

Several territories settled after 146. For example, parts of Germania seem to have been subject to paying tribute without a formal charter3.

Provisions 

The  had four main objectives: I) it divided the province into regions, II) it made arrangements for taxes and marked out tax districts, III) it divided the province into  for judicial purposes, and IV) it defined the relationships between the senate, magistrates, and popular assemblies1. 

The  were not detailed constitutions designed to resolve everyday affairs. Rather, they were basic charters or formulas which organized the territory and specified certain basic regulations. The day-to-day administration of the province was done by a combination of magistrates and senatorial commissions. The governor of the province had autonomous power and was free to enact edicts so long as they complied with the 4. The  determined the extent of the governor's power in the sense that it limited the kinds of cases that the governor could hear2.

See also 
Roman Law
List of Roman laws
Ancient Rome
Civitas foederata
Civitas libera
Civitas stipendaria

References 

1. Hardy, E.G.  C. Plinii Caecilii Secundi Epistulae.  London, England.  MacMillan and Company. 1889. (primary source)

2. “Jurisdiction.” The Administration of the Empire. The Last Age of the Roman Republic. Ed. Cook, Andrew Lintott, and Rawson. Cambridge Ancient History. Volume IX.  Cambridge University Press. Cambridge, Great Britain. 1994. 

3. Lintott, Andrew. “What Was the ‘Imperium Romanum’?” Greece & Rome, 2nd Ser., Vol. 28, No. 1, Jubilee Year. (Apr., 1981), pp. 53-67.

4. "Province." Encyclopædia Britannica. 2007. Encyclopædia Britannica Online. 6 May 2007 <http://www.britannica.com/eb/article-9061652>.

5. "Roman Timeline 2nd Century B.C." 2007. UNRV History. May 17, 2007. <http://www.unrv.com/empire/roman-timeline-2nd-century.php>

Subdivisions of ancient Rome
Roman law